Martti Aljand (born 22 November 1987 in Tallinn) is an Estonian individual medley and breaststroke swimmer.

At 2008 Summer Olympics he finished 45th in 100 m breaststroke with national record and 46th in 200 m breaststroke.

Records

He is 33-time long course and 43-time short course Estonian swimming champion. He has broken 58 Estonian records in swimming.

Personal
His older sisters Triin and Berit are also a swimmers. His father Riho is a swimming coach, and his grandmother, Ulvi Voog (Indrikson), is a former Olympic swimmer.

He is married to another Estonian swimmer Annika Saarnak, they have a daughter.

References

External links
Martti Aljand Bio on CalBears

1987 births
Living people
Swimmers from Tallinn
Estonian male breaststroke swimmers
Estonian male medley swimmers
Olympic swimmers of Estonia
Swimmers at the 2008 Summer Olympics
Estonian expatriate sportspeople in the United States
21st-century Estonian people
Estonian swimming coaches